Auburn-Lewiston Airport  is a public airport in Androscoggin County, Maine, opened in 1935. It is five miles southwest of the cities of Auburn and Lewiston, both of which own and operate the airport, though it is in the Auburn city limits.

The airport is not served by any commercial airline, but is served by several charter airlines. The airport was the site of a Bar Harbor Airlines accident that killed "America's Youngest Ambassador" Samantha Smith.

Lewiston NAAF
From late 1942, during World War II, the airfield was under the control of the United States Navy for use as a base for anti-submarine patrols by Squadron VS-31. It was commissioned on 15 April 1943 as Naval Auxiliary Air Facility Lewiston, and used along with Naval Air Station Brunswick to train British and American torpedo bomber pilots until 1945. Naval operations ceased on 1 December 1945, and the site was declared surplus in 1946 and handed back to the cities of Auburn and Lewiston in 1947/8.

Facilities and aircraft 
It has two asphalt runways: 4/22 is 5,001 by 100 feet (1,524 x 30 m) and 17/35 is 2,750 by 75 feet (838 x 23 m).

In the year ending May 1, 2008 the airport had 74,180 aircraft operations, average 203 per day: 64% general aviation, 36% air taxi, and <1% military. 120 aircraft were then based at this airport: 75% single-engine, 14% multi-engine, 1% jet, 3% helicopter and 6% ultralight.

Incidents and accidents 
On  August 25, 1985, Bar Harbor Airlines Flight 1808 carrying 8 passengers (6 passengers, 2 crew) was attempting to land at the airport when it crashed 500 feet to the right of the airport's runway center line, killing all passengers and crew. It was determined that the crash was due to a mixture of weather conditions, incorrect altimeter settings, and pilot error. The accident attracted unusual public attention due to one of the passengers, Samantha Smith, a 13 year old peace activist from Houlton, Maine,

See also 
 Bar Harbor Airlines Flight 1808
 Samantha Smith

References

External links 
 Aerial image as of 7 June 1997 from USGS The National Map
 

Airports in Androscoggin County, Maine
Buildings and structures in Auburn, Maine
Lewiston–Auburn, Maine
Former Essential Air Service airports